The Silver Bear Grand Jury Prize (also Jury Grand Prix, Grand Prize of the Jury) is an award given by the jury at the Berlin International Film Festival to one of the feature films in competition.  It is the runner-up to the Golden Bear prize and is considered the second most prestigious prize at the festival.

The award was first introduced at the 15th Berlin International Film Festival in 1965.  The prize was also formerly known as the Special Jury Prize.  In 2014 at the 64th Berlin International Film Festival, its title was officially changed to "Grand Jury Prize".

Winners 

 Notes
 # Denotes Ex-aequo win

Notes

External links 

Berlinale website

Grand Jury Prize
 
German film awards